The Piro languages, a.k.a. Purus, or in Aikhenvald South-Western Arawak, are Arawakan languages of the Peruvian and western Brazilian Amazon.

Languages
Kaufman (1994) gives the following breakdown:

 Piro (Yine, Machinere)
 Iñapari 
 Kanamaré (†)
 Apurinã
 Mashco Piro a.k.a. Cujareño.

Kaufman had considered the last to be a dialect of Piro; Aikhenvald suggests it may have been a dialect of Iñapari.

Further reading
Brandão, Ana Paula; Sidi Facundes. Estudos comparativos do léxico da fauna e flora Aruák. Boletim do Museu Paraense Emílio Goeldi. Ciências humanas, Belém, v. 2, n. 2, p. 133–168, May/Aug. 2007.
Facundes, Sidney da Silva. The language of the Apurinã people of Brazil (Arawak). Doctoral dissertation, University of New York at Buffalo, Buffalo, 2000.
Facundes, Sidney da Silva. The comparative linguistic methodology and its contribution to improve the knowledge of Arawakan. In: Hill, Jonathan D.; Fernando Santos-Granero (eds.). Comparative Arawakan histories. Illinois: University of Illinois Press, 2002. p. 74–96.

References

Arawakan languages